The CONCACAF Gold Cup is North America's major tournament in senior men's soccer and determines the continental champion. Until 1989, the tournament was known as CONCACAF Championship. 

Qatar are not members of the North American football confederation CONCACAF, and were invited to the Gold Cup as guests for the first time in 2021.

Overall record

Qatar was the second team from Asia to participate in the CONCACAF Gold Cup, and were invited for the first time in 2021.

2021 CONCACAF Gold Cup

Group stage

Knockout stage

Quarter-finals

Semi-finals

Notes

References

External links
RSSSF archives and results
Soccerway database

Countries at the CONCACAF Gold Cup
Qatar national football team